Kaoh Pao River, also Prek Khao Pao or Preaek Khao Pao, is a river and estuary in Koh Kong Province, Cambodia. It is flowing past the provincial capital of Khemarak Phoumin, and empties in the Gulf of Thailand.

Notes and references 

Rivers of Cambodia
Geography of Koh Kong province